William Bulkeley may refer to:
 William Bulkeley (Welsh politician) (16th century)
 William Bulkeley (priest) (17th century)
 William Bulkeley (sheriff) (1691−1760), diarist
 William Bulkeley (merchant) (18th century)
 William H. Bulkeley (1840–1902), American politician

See also 
 William Bulkeley Hughes, 19th-century Welsh politician
 Williams-Bulkeley baronets